Madhubala is a 1950 Indian Hindi-language romantic drama film directed by Prahlad Dutt, and starring Madhubala in the titular role of a heiress wooed by several mercenary man and her search for true love. Dev Anand plays her love interest, and Jeevan, Randhir and Ramesh Thakur also star in pivotal roles. It was the first of many films to star Madhubala and Dev Anand together.

Plot 
Madhubala was heir to two inheritances of her father: wealth and heart disease. She was leading a lonely life, her only solace being the Doctor who was more like a father to her. Many young people were meeting her off and on with different motives and there was regular tussle between them to win her favours. Amongst them the most insistent was Kalicharan, the proprietor of a dramatic company. Madhubala was passing her days trying to draw what comfort she could. Seeing her condition, the Doctor advised her to go to a village as the cool and sedate atmosphere over there would have a soothing effect on her. In the village Madhubala met Ashok. After few bad encounters, both began to love each other.

They decided to marry. Preparations for marriage were going ahead. As luck would have it, Madhubala's friends headed by Kalicharan came to the village in search of her. Kalicharan decided his game. He cracked cruel jokes at Ashok's cost. Ashok was stung to the quick. He felt that Madhubala was party to this. He broke up the preparation for the marriage. Because of Ashok's attitude Madhubala came to the city but with a weakened heart. She began to lose interest in life. Ashok began to relent. He came to the city and met Madhubala. But Madhubala's cold attitude upset him. In a frenzy, began to create havoc and nuisance in the street. He was fined for this misdemeanour. He was released as Madhubala paid the fine. Kalicharan played his cards expertly. He whispered into Ashok's ears that Madhubala paid up the fine just to spite him. He engaged him in his dramatic company in order to put an end to Ashok's life. A burning curtain fell on Ashok's head and he lost his eyesight. Madhubala went to the hospital to see him but Ashok scolded her. Ashok went to his native place. Madhubala went to the village. She got herself engaged at his place under an assumed name Sheela. Under her careful nursing Ashok's eyes were cured. When Ashok came to know that Sheela and Madhubala were the same, he got excited. But Randhir explained the position and on the misunderstanding being removed, the lovers united.

Cast 
The main cast of the film included:
 Dev Anand as Ashok
 Madhubala as Madhubala
 Jeevan as Kalicharan
 Ram Avtar as Pandit
 Ramesh Thakur as Doctor
 Randhir as Randhir

Production

Casting 
In 1946, when Madhubala was 13 years old and playing juvenile roles, her pregnant mother suddenly became very ill. To save her life, there was a need of a good hospital. Madhubala, the sole earning member in the whole family, used to be paid a little amount of 300 in those days, while the hospital's fees was no less than 2,000. In this time of need, Ranjit Studios' Chandulal Shah came at the front to help her financially. He gave her 2,000 without a single question and her mother's life was saved.

This incident and Shah's kindness left a deep mark on Madhubala. In 1950, by which Madhubala was popular star, the studio was passing through bad times and was in dire of a hit. At this point of time, Madhubala not only did agree to star in a film by the studio but even worked in the  film for free. This film, consequently named after the actress, came to be known as Madhubala.

Soundtrack

Release

Critical reception 
The film was derided by film critics for its direction. The Motion Picture Magazine reviewed, "Under Prahlad Dutt's slow stupid and inane direction, Madhubala loses all coherency and logic. It stumbles forward in a clumsy manner till you lose all patience with it and curse under your breath every minute of the two hours." Madhubala was unanimously praised for her work, but other stars including Dev Anand were ridiculed for their performances.

Baburao Patel wrote in Filmindia's October 1950 issue, "This picture proves that even a popular and talented star like Madhubala rushes to work in any picture without worrying about art, quality or even her own reputation as an artist of talent."

Box office 
Due to the popularity surrounding Madhubala in those years, Madhubala was one of the most famous pictures in its initial week of release; The Motion Picture Magazine reported that the film was ruining to packed houses. However, the audience's interest in the film almost disappeared due to the negative reviews. According to Madhubala's biographer Khatijia Akbar, Madhubala was a "box office disaster".

References

Books

Citations

External links 
 

1950 films
1950s Hindi-language films